Oppert is a German surname. Notable people with the surname include:

Julius Oppert (1825–1905), French-German Assyriologist
Ernst Oppert (1832–1903), German businessman
Gustav Solomon Oppert (1836–1908), German Indologist
Marie Oppert (born 1997), iFrench singer and actress

German-language surnames